Itambe is a monotypic snout moth genus. It was described by Émile Louis Ragonot in 1892, and contains the species Itambe fenestalis. It is found in Brazil.

References

Moths described in 1892
Chrysauginae
Moths of South America